Sătucu may refer to several villages in Romania:

 Sătucu, a village in Săruleşti Commune, Călăraşi County
 Sătucu, a village in Tomşani Commune, Prahova County